

Karl Angerstein (4 December 1890 – 20 September 1985) was a German general during World War II who commanded the 1st Air Corps.  He was a recipient of the Knight's Cross of the Iron Cross of Nazi Germany.

Awards
 German Cross in Gold on 16 July 1942 as Generalmajor in Kampfgeschwader 1
 Knight's Cross of the Iron Cross on 2 November 1940 as Oberst and Geschwaderkommodore of Kampfgeschwader 1 "Hindenburg"

References

Citations

Bibliography

 
 

1890 births
1985 deaths
Luftwaffe World War II generals
People from Mühlhausen
Luftstreitkräfte personnel
Recipients of the Gold German Cross
Recipients of the Knight's Cross of the Iron Cross
German prisoners of war in World War II held by the United States
20th-century Freikorps personnel
Prussian Army personnel
Recipients of the clasp to the Iron Cross, 1st class
Lieutenant generals of the Luftwaffe
Military personnel from Thuringia